Tsui Fang-hsuan (born 8 March 1984) is a Taiwanese taekwondo practitioner. She won a bronze medal in heavyweight at the 2007 World Taekwondo Championships. She won a silver medal at the 2004 Asian Taekwondo Championships, and a bronze medal at the 2006 Asian Taekwondo Championships.

References

External links

1984 births
Living people
Taiwanese female taekwondo practitioners
World Taekwondo Championships medalists
Asian Taekwondo Championships medalists
21st-century Taiwanese women